"Dreamer" is the debut single by Australian dance duo Tune in Tokyo. The single was released in November 2010 and reached #3 on the ARIA Club Charts.

Background
Tune in Tokyo was first formed by Natalie Gauci and Paul Brandoli in 2010 after Gauci was inspired hanging out in Melbourne's gay dance clubs with musician, and her then-husband, Hamish Cowan (Cordrazine).

Track listing
Radio Edits single
 "Dreamer" (Radio Edit) — 3:11
 "Dreamer" (Javi Mula Radio Edit) — 3:03

Remixes single
 "Dreamer" (Javi Mula Remix) — 5:00
 "Dreamer" (Original Mix) — 6:18
 "Dreamer" (Benny Royal Remix) — 6:02
 "Dreamer" (Nick Galea Remix) — 7:07
 "Dreamer" (Antoine Dessante Remix) — 7:11
 "Dreamer" (Sgt Slick Remix) — 5:49
 "Dreamer" (Phonatics Remix) — 6:46
 "Dreamer" (Benny Royal Dub) — 6:02

Charts

References

2010 debut singles
Natalie Gauci songs
2010 songs